The men's halfpipe competition in freestyle skiing at the 2022 Winter Olympics was held on 17 February (qualification) and 19 February (final), at the Genting Snow Park in Zhangjiakou. The podium consisted of all the medalists in the same event in 2018, but in a different order. Nico Porteous of New Zealand, the 2018 bronze medalist, won the event, bringing to New Zealand the second ever winter Olympic gold medal. David Wise of the United States, the champion in both previous events, won the silver medal, and Alex Ferreira, also of the United States, the 2018 silver medalist, this time won bronze.

At the 2021–22 FIS Freestyle Ski World Cup, there were four events held before the Olympics, and Brendan Mackay and Ferreira were tied for the first place in the rankings, followed by Porteous and Wise. Porteous is also the 2021 X-Games winner in super-pipe, as well as the 2021 world champion.

Qualification

A total of 25 athletes qualified to compete at the games. For an athlete to compete they must have a minimum of 50.00 FIS points on the FIS Points List on January 17, 2022 and a top 30 finish in a World Cup event or at the FIS Freestyle Ski World Championships 2021. A country could enter a maximum of four athletes into the event.

Results

Qualification
 Q — Qualified for the Final

The top 12 athletes in the qualifiers moved on to the medal round.

Final

References

Men's freestyle skiing at the 2022 Winter Olympics